Ti presento un amico is a 2010 Italian film directed by Carlo Vanzina.

Plot
Marco Ferretti is an Italian manager who is young and beautiful, but he cannot stand the presence of women after a difficult affair. When Marco goes to Milan for an appointment, he meets four beautiful girls who disrupt his life with love.

Cast
 Raoul Bova as Marco Ferretti
 Martina Stella as Gabriella
 Sarah Felberbaum
 Kelly Reilly
 Barbora Bobuľová
 Stefano Macchi
 Alessandro Bolide

References

External links
 

2010 films
2010s Italian-language films
2010 comedy films
Films directed by Carlo Vanzina
Italian comedy films
2010s Italian films